Perry N. Halkitis (born February 24, 1963) is an American of Greek ancestry public health psychologist and applied statistician known for his research on the health of LGBT populations with an emphasis on HIV/AIDS, substance use, and mental health. Perry is Dean and Professor of Biostatistics, Health Education, and Behavioral Science at the Rutgers School of Public Health.

Between 1998 and 2017, Perry was faculty at New York University, serving in a variety of capacities, the last of which was Senior Association Dean for Academic and Faculty Affairs at the College of Global Public Health and Professor of Global Public Health, Applied Psychology, and Medicine. He is also the founder and director of the Center for Health, Identity, Behavior, and Prevention Studies (CHIBPS) at New York University, a bio-behavioral funded research site funded that also serves as a training site for public health, psychology, medical and student scholars working in the arena of LGBT health disparities informed by a theory of syndemics.

Biography
Halkitis received his B.A. in Biology and Psychology from Columbia University, his masters in Education/Human Development and Learning from City University of New York (CUNY): Hunter College, a Masters of Philosophy in Educational Psychology from CUNY: Graduate Center, and a Ph.D. in Quantitative Methods in Educational and Psychological Research from CUNY: Graduate Center. Before moving to Rutgers, Halkitis was previously Associate Dean for Research & Doctoral Studies, Professor of Applied Psychology and Public Health, and Director of the Center for Health, Identity, Behavior & Prevention Studies (CHIBPS)  at the Steinhardt School of Culture, Education, and Human Development, a division of New York University. Halkitis has been actively involved in governance with the American Psychological Association
Committee on Psychology and AIDS, (COPA) 2010-2012 and the Committee on Lesbian, Gay, Bisexual and Transgender Concerns, Halkitis is also a research affiliate of the Aaron Diamond AIDS Research Center  at New York University School of Medicine.  and co-director of the New York University's Clinical and Translational Science Institute TL1 Predoctoral Program. Prior to his current positions, Halkitis was Director of Research at Gay Men's Health Crisis. He is internationally recognized for his work examining the intersection between the HIV, drug abuse, and mental health syndemics, and is well known as one of the nation's leading experts on addictions, especially methamphetamine. In addition, Halkitis has undertaken extensive work in psychometrics.

He serves on the Committee on Psychology and AIDS, (COPA) 2010-2012 and the Committee on Lesbian, Gay, Bisexual and Transgender Concerns, Halkitis is also a research affiliate of the Aaron Diamond AIDS Research Center at New York University School of Medicine.  and co-director of the New York University's Clinical and Translational Science Institute TL1 Predoctoral Program. Prior to his current positions, Halkitis was Director of Research at Gay Men's Health Crisis.

Degrees held
B.A. Columbia University  1984, Biology & Psychology
M.S. Hunter College, City University of New York 1988, Education/Human Development & Learning
M.Phil. Graduate Center, City University of New York 1993, Educational Psychology
Ph.D. Graduate Center, City University of New York 1995, Psychology: Quantitative Methods in Psychology & Education
MPH CUNY School of Public Health 2013, Epidemiology

Research
Halkitis’ research examines how risk-taking is influenced by interpersonal, contextual and cultural factors, especially with regard to the AIDS pandemic and drug abuse in the United States, and this research has been funded by various private and public entities including the National Institutes of Health, Centers for Disease Control and Prevention, New York City Department of Health, New York State AIDS Institute, New York Community Trust, United Way of America, and American Psychological Foundation.
The focus of his research involves health, human behavior, and development, with a specific application to the domains of HIV/AIDS and drug abuse, which has addressed some of most important social and public health issues of our time.

Publications

Books
Halkitis, P.N.  (2013).  The AIDS Generation: Stories and Survival of Resilience.  The AIDS Generation: Stories and Survival of Resilience
Halkitis, P. N.  (2009).  Methamphetamine addiction: Biological foundations, psychological factors, and social consequences. Washington, DC: American Psychological Association.
Halkitis, P. N. Wilton, L., & Drescher, J. (Eds.). (2006). Barebacking: Psychosocial and public health approaches. Binghamton, New York: Haworth Press.
Halkitis, P. N., Gomez, C., & Wolitski, R. (Eds.) (2005). HIV + sex: The psychological and interpersonal dynamics of HIV-seropositive gay and bisexual men's relationships. Washington DC: American Psychological Association.

Awards
Halkitis is the recipient of numerous awards from both professional and community-based organizations, and was elected a fellow of the New York Academy of Medicine in 2005.
1999: American Psychological Foundation (APF), Wayne F. Placek Award
2000: New York University, Steinhardt School, Daniel E. Griffiths Research Award
2002: American Psychological Association, Committee on Psychology & AIDS, Leadership Award
2003: American Psychological Association, Division on Lesbian, Gay, and Bisexual Concerns,  Distinguished Research Award
2004: New York University, Office of LGBT Student Services, Award for Outstanding Commitment to the Queer Community
2004: New York University, Steinhardt School, Teaching Excellence Award
2005: TheBody.com, HIV Prevention Leader Award
2005: New York Academy of Medicine, Elected Fellow
2006: American Psychological Association, Committee on Lesbian, Gay & Bisexual Concerns, Outstanding Achievement Award
2007: Society of Behavioral Medicine, Elected Fellow
2009: American Psychological Association, Division of Addictions, Elected Fellow
2009: New York University Distinguished Teaching Award Nominee
2010: New York University Distinguished Teaching Award Nominee
2010: New York University, Office of LGBT Student Services Award for Student Centered Dedication and Advocacy
2010: Society of Behavioral Medicine, Research to Practice Dissemination Award
2010: American Psychological Association, Award for Distinguished Contributions to Psychology In Public Interest (Early Career)

References

External links
 Center for Health, Identity, Behavior, and Prevention Studies homepage

1963 births
Living people
21st-century American psychologists
The Bronx High School of Science alumni
Hunter College alumni
Columbia College (New York) alumni
City University of New York alumni
Writers from New York City
20th-century American psychologists